Renaldo Nehemiah (born March 24, 1959) is a retired American track and field athlete who specialized in the 110 m hurdles.  He was ranked number one in the world for four straight years, and is a former world record holder. Nehemiah is the first man to run the event in under 13 seconds. Nehemiah also played pro football in the National Football League (NFL) as a wide receiver for the San Francisco 49ers from 1982 to 1985, before returning to track and field athletics from 1986 to 1991. After retiring from competition, he has worked in sports management.

Track and field career
Nehemiah was nicknamed "Skeets" as a baby because he crawled along the floor  so fast. The nickname followed him. He was the national junior champion in 1977, the same year he graduated from Scotch Plains-Fanwood High School in his hometown of Scotch Plains, New Jersey. Nehemiah's high school personal bests were 12.9 in the 110 meter hurdles and 35.8 in the 300 meter hurdles, so much faster than his competitors that his coach had him compete over 42 inch hurdles (collegiate height) and occasionally train over 45 inch hurdles. He was Track and Field News "High School Athlete of the Year" in 1977. The cover was noted for showing Nehemiah in a reflective mood rather than in action as most other T&FN covers. "I always look spaced out at meets, sort of nonchalant," Nehemiah told The New York Times in response. After graduating from Scotch Plains-Fanwood, Nehemiah attended the University of Maryland, where he won three NCAA titles including the 1978-9 NCAA Indoor Championships.

Nehemiah's sophomore year at Maryland proved to be his breakout year. He broke the world record in the 110 meter hurdles twice in two weeks, running 13.16 and then 13.00. He won the 1979 IAAF World Cup and Pan-American Games titles, as well as the second of four U.S. national titles. At the 1979 Penn Relays, Nehemiah anchored UMD's shuttle hurdle relay, 4 × 400 meter relay, and 4 × 200 meter relay, and was named meet MVP. During the relays he recorded an unofficial split of 19.4 seconds in the 4-by-200 meter relay and a 44.3 second split in the 4 × 400 meter relay. Nehemiah described his 400-meter leg as follows:

The prohibitive favorite to win the 110-meter hurdles in the 1980 Summer Olympics, he was unable to compete due to a 65-nation boycott of the Games. Nehemiah received one of 461 Congressional Gold Medals created for the athletes. At the 1981 Weltklasse meeting in Zürich, Switzerland, Nehemiah broke the world record for the 110 meter hurdles and became the first person to ever run the race in less than 13 seconds. In an interview, Nehemiah explained his race as less than ideal:

Pat Connolly, who also coached sprinter Evelyn Ashford, was instrumental in reviving Nehemiah's track career after his short foray in football.  Connolly is quoted as saying:

She also believed he may have been better suited for the 400 m hurdle event.  She is on record as saying:

Football career
Despite never playing football in college, Nehemiah worked out in 1982 for several NFL teams, including the San Francisco 49ers, Pittsburgh Steelers, Washington Redskins, Dallas Cowboys, Philadelphia Eagles, New York Giants and New England Patriots; he signed with the 49ers. During his three years as a wide receiver he caught 43 passes for 754 yards, a 17.5 average, and four touchdowns. Although he was part of the Super Bowl winning team in the 1984 season, he did not play a major role. His football career is deemed by some to be a failure – many think it represents one of the most glaring mistakes ever made by 49ers head coach Bill Walsh – winning Nehemiah a comparison to the track star Jim Hines, who won an infamous nickname for his inability to catch the ball. However, Nehemiah's presence on the field would often force opposing defenses into deep coverage. Nehemiah was deemed expendable in 1985 when the 49ers drafted Jerry Rice in the first round, and he returned to the track in 1986.

The Superstars
Nehemiah was the only four-time winner of The Superstars, a made-for-television decathlon-style competition broadcast by ABC Sports (and during the late 1980s, NBC Sports). He won the event in 1981, 1982, 1983 and 1986.

Management
He is currently involved with Athletics Managers, a sports management and marketing agency. Clients he has represented have included Allen Johnson, Mark Crear, Justin Gatlin, Sha'Carri Richardson and 2012 400 meter Olympic Gold Medalist Kirani James.

References

External links

Hall of Fame
Pat Connolly Quotes
1979 Penn Relays Quotes
Career Football Stats
Super Bowl XIX Stats
Video containing Nehemiah's 12.93

1959 births
Living people
American male hurdlers
American football wide receivers
Maryland Terrapins football players
Players of American football from Newark, New Jersey
Sportspeople from Union County, New Jersey
People from Scotch Plains, New Jersey
Scotch Plains-Fanwood High School alumni
Track and field athletes from Newark, New Jersey
San Francisco 49ers players
Athletes (track and field) at the 1979 Pan American Games
Pan American Games medalists in athletics (track and field)
Pan American Games gold medalists for the United States
Congressional Gold Medal recipients
United States collegiate record holders in athletics (track and field)
Track and field athletes in the National Football League
Medalists at the 1979 Pan American Games